A gas turbine locomotive is a type of railway locomotive in which the prime mover is a gas turbine. Several types of gas turbine locomotive have been developed, differing mainly in the means by which mechanical power is conveyed to the driving wheels (drivers). A gas turbine train typically consists of two power cars (one at each end of the train), and one or more intermediate passenger cars.

A gas turbine offers some advantages over a piston engine. There are few moving parts, decreasing the need for lubrication and potentially reducing maintenance costs, and the power-to-weight ratio is much higher. A turbine of a given power output is also physically smaller than an equally powerful piston engine, so that a locomotive can be extremely powerful without needing to be inordinately large. 

However, a gas turbine's power output and efficiency both drop dramatically with rotational speed, unlike a piston engine, which has a comparatively flat power curve. This makes GTEL systems useful primarily for long-distance high-speed runs. Additional problems with gas turbine-electric locomotives include the fact that they are very noisy and produce such extremely hot exhaust gasses that, if the locomotive were parked under an overpass paved with asphalt, it could melt the asphalt.

Unlike steam engines, internal combustion engines require a transmission to power the wheels. The engine must be allowed to continue running when the locomotive is stopped.

Early developments
A gas turbine locomotive was patented in 1861 by Marc Antoine Francois Mennons (British patent no. 1633). The drawings in Mennons' patent show a locomotive of 0-4-2 wheel arrangement with a cylindrical casing resembling a boiler. At the front of the casing is the compressor, which Mennons calls a ventilator. This supplies air to a firebox and the hot gases from the firebox drive a turbine at the back of the casing. The exhaust from the turbine then travels forwards through ducts to preheat the incoming air. The turbine drives the compressor through gearing and an external shaft. There is additional gearing to a jackshaft which drives the wheels through side rods. The fuel is solid (presumably coal, coke or wood) and there is a fuel bunker at the rear. There is no evidence that the locomotive was actually built but the design includes the essential features of gas turbine locomotives built in the 20th century, including compressor, combustion chamber, turbine and air pre-heater.

Work leading to the emergence of the gas turbine locomotive began in France and Sweden in the 1920s but the first locomotive did not appear until the 1940s. High fuel consumption was a major factor in the decline of conventional gas-turbine locomotives and the use of a piston engine as a gas generator would probably give better fuel economy than a turbine-type compressor, especially when running at less than full load.

One option is a two-shaft machine, with separate turbines to drive the compressor and the output shaft. Another is to use a separate gas generator, which may be of either rotary or piston type.

Gas turbine-mechanical
Gas turbine-mechanical locomotives use a mechanical transmission to deliver the power output of gas turbines to the wheels. Owing to the difference in their speeds, this is technically challenging and so a mechanical transmission did not appear until ten years after the first electric transmissions.

France

The first gas turbine-mechanical locomotive in the world, Class 040-GA-1 of 1,000 hp was built by Renault in 1952 and had a Pescara free-piston engine as a gas generator. It was followed by two further locomotives, Class 060-GA-1 of 2,400 hp in 1959–61.

The Pescara gas generator in 040-GA-1 consisted of a horizontal, single cylinder, two-stroke diesel engine with opposed pistons.  It had no crankshaft and the pistons were returned after each power stroke by compression and expansion of air in a separate cylinder.  The exhaust from the diesel engine powered the gas-turbine which drove the wheels through a two-speed gearbox and propeller shafts. The free-piston engine was patented in 1934 by Raul Pateras Pescara.

Several similar locomotives were built in the USSR by Kharkov Locomotive Works.

Sweden
The power gas locomotive was built by Gotaverken.  It had a vertical, five cylinder, two-stroke diesel engine with opposed pistons.  There was a single crankshaft connected to both upper and lower pistons.  The exhaust from the diesel engine powered the gas turbine which drove the wheels through reduction gearing, jack shaft and side rods.

Czechoslovakia
Turbine power was considered for railway traction in the former Czechoslovakia. Two turbine-powered prototypes were built, designated TL 659.001 and TL 659.002, featuring C-C wheel arrangement, 3200 hp (2.4 MW) main turbine, helper turbine and Tatra 111 helper diesel engine. 

The first prototype (TL 659.001) was finished in February 1958 and was scheduled to be exhibited at Expo '58. However, this was aborted because it was not ready in time. The first out-of-factory tests were conducted in March 1959 on the Plzeň–Cheb–Sokolov line. On 15 May 1959, the first prototype pulled its heaviest train, 6486 metric tons, but the turbine caught fire only a day later. The engine was never restored and eventually scrapped. 

The second prototype (TL 659.002) was built with lessons learned from the first. It left the factory in March 1960 and was the only turbine locomotive to pass the tests for regular service on tracks of the former Czechoslovak State Railways. It was tried near Kolín and Plzeň with mixed results. This engine was taken out of service in April 1966 and sold to the University of Žilina as an educational instrument. It was scrapped some time later.

Although the experiments had mixed results, these were the most powerful locomotives with a purely mechanical powertrain in the world and also the most powerful independent-traction locomotives in Czechoslovakia.

United Kingdom
The British Rail GT3 was a simple machine consisting essentially of a standard oil-fired gas turbine mounted on a standard steam locomotive chassis, built as a demonstrator by English Electric in 1961. Its almost crude simplicity enabled it to avoid much of the unreliability which had plagued the complex experimental GTELs 18000 and 18100 in earlier years, but it failed to be competitive against conventional traction and was scrapped.

Examples
Examples of gas turbine-mechanical locomotives:

 1933 Nydqvist and Holm, 1-B-1, Sweden
 1952 Davenport-Bessler Corp., 1-B-1, United States, 300 hp (220 kW) (designed by R. Tom Sawyer)
 1951 Renault, France, B-B, 
 1954 Gotaverken, Sweden, 1-C-1, 
 1958 Renault, France, C-C, 
 1958 Škoda, C-C, Czechoslovakia, 
 1959 British Rail GT3, 2-C-0,

Gas turbine-electric

A gas turbine-electric locomotive (GTEL) is a locomotive that uses a gas turbine to drive an electric generator or alternator, producing an electric current which is used to power traction motors. This type of locomotive was first experimented with during the Second World War, but reached its peak in the 1950s to 1960s. Few locomotives use this system today.

A GTEL uses a turbo-electric drivetrain in which a turboshaft engine drives the electric generator or alternator via a system of gears. The electric current is distributed to power the traction motors that drive the locomotive. In overall terms the system is very similar to a conventional diesel-electric, with the large diesel engine replaced with a smaller gas turbine of similar power.

Union Pacific operated the largest fleet of such locomotives of any railroad in the world, and was the only railroad to use them for hauling freight. Most other GTELs have been built for small passenger trains, and only a few have seen any real success in that role. With a rise in fuel costs (eventually leading to the 1973 oil crisis), gas turbine locomotives became uneconomical to operate, and many were taken out of service. Union Pacific's locomotives also required more maintenance than originally anticipated, due to fouling of the turbine blades by the Bunker C oil used as fuel.

Switzerland

It was completed in 1941, and then underwent testing before entering regular service. The Am 4/6 was the world's first gas turbine-electric locomotive. It was intended primarily to work light, fast, passenger trains on routes that normally handle insufficient traffic to justify electrification.

United Kingdom

Two gas turbine locomotives of different design, 18000 and 18100, were ordered by the Great Western Railway (GWR) but completed for the newly nationalised British Railways.

British Rail 18000 was built by Brown Boveri and delivered in 1949. It was a 1840 kW (2470 hp) GTEL, ordered by the GWR and used for express passenger services.

British Rail 18100 was built by Metropolitan-Vickers and delivered in 1951.

A third locomotive, the GT3, was constructed in 1961. Although built by English Electric, who had pioneered electric transmission with LMS 10000 locomotives, this used a turbine-mechanical transmission.

The British Rail APT-E, the prototype of the Advanced Passenger Train, was turbine-powered. Like the French TGV, later models used an alternative electric powertrain. This choice was made because British Leyland, the turbine supplier, ceased production of the model used in the APT-E, having lost interest in gas turbine technology following the 1970s oil crisis.

United States

ALCO-GE built a prototype oil-fired gas turbine-electric locomotive in 1948, with a B-B-B-B wheel arrangement. After demonstration runs it was acquired by Union Pacific, who were seeking a more powerful alternative to diesel for transcontinental trains. 

UP ran a fleet of 55 turbine-powered freight locomotives starting in the early 1950s, all produced by Alco-GE. The first- and second-generation versions shared the same wheel arrangement as the prototype; the third-generation version were C-C types. All were widely used on long-haul routes, and were cost-effective despite their poor fuel economy, due to their use of "leftover" fuels from the petroleum industry. At their height the railroad estimated that they powered about 10% of Union Pacific's freight trains, a much wider use than any other example of this class. As other uses were found for these heavier petroleum byproducts, notably for plastics, the cost of the Bunker C fuel increased until the units became too expensive to operate and they were retired from service by 1969.

In April 1950, Baldwin and Westinghouse completed an experimental  turbine locomotive, #4000, known as the Blue Goose, also using the B-B-B-B wheel arrangement. While it was demonstrated successfully in both freight and passenger service on the PRR, MKT, and CNW, no production orders followed, and it was scrapped in 1953.

In the 1960s United Aircraft built the Turbo passenger train, which was tested by the Pennsylvania Railroad and later used by Amtrak and Via Rail. The Via remained in service into the 1980s and had an excellent maintenance record during this period, but was eventually replaced by the LRC in 1982. Amtrak purchased two different types of turbine-powered trainsets, which were both called Turboliners. The sets of the first type were similar in appearance to SNCF's T 2000 Turbotrain, though compliance with FRA safety regulations made them heavier and slower than the French trains. None of the first-type Turboliners remain in service. Amtrak also added a number of similarly named Rohr Turboliners (or RTL) to its roster. There were plans to rebuild these as RTL IIIs, but this program was cancelled. The units owned by New York State were sold for scrap and the three remaining RTL trainsets are stored at North Brunswick, New Jersey and New Haven, Connecticut.

In 1966, the Long Island Rail Road tested an experimental gas turbine railcar (numbered GT-1), powered by two Garrett turbine engines. This car was based on a Budd Pioneer III design, with transmissions similar to Budd's 1950s-era RDCs. The car was later modified (as GT-2) to add the ability to run on electric third rail as well.

In 1977, the LIRR tested eight more gas turbine-electric/electric dual mode railcars, in an experiment sponsored by the USDOT. Four of these cars had GE-designed powertrains, while the other four had powertrains designed by Garrett (four more cars had been ordered with GM/Allison powertrains, but were canceled). These cars were similar to LIRR's M1 EMU cars in appearance, with the addition of step wells for loading from low level platforms. The cars suffered from poor fuel economy and mechanical problems, and were withdrawn from service after a short period of time. The four GE-powered cars were converted to M1 EMUs and the Garrett cars were scrapped.

In 1997 the Federal Railroad Administration (FRA) solicited proposals to develop high speed locomotives for routes outside the Northeast Corridor where electrification was not economical. Bombardier Ltd, at the Plattsburg, N.Y. plant where the Acela was produced, developed a prototype (JetTrain) which combined a Pratt & Whitney Canada PW100 gas turbine and a diesel engine with a single gearbox powering four traction motors identical to those in Acela. The diesel  provided head end power and low speed traction, with the turbine not being started until after leaving stations. The prototype was completed in June 2000, and safety testing was done at the FRA's Pueblo, CO test track beginning in the summer of 2001. The prototype was then taken on a tour of potential sites for high speed service, but no service has yet begun.

Russia
Two gas turbine-electric locomotive types underwent testing in the Soviet Union. The test program began in 1959 and lasted into the early 1970s. The G1-01 freight GTEL, produced by Kolomna Locomotive Works, was intended to consist of two locomotives of a C-C wheel arrangement, but only one section was built. The GP1 passenger locomotive was a similar design with body of TEP60 diesel locomotive, also with a C-C wheel arrangement, introduced to the test program in 1964. Two units were built by Kolomna Works, GP1-0001 and GP1-0002, which were also used in regular service with passenger trains.

Another soviet gas turbine-hydraulic freight locomotive type GT101 was developed and produced in 1960 by Luhansk Locomotive Works. Like the G1 locomotive, it was intended to consist of two sections of a C-C wheel arrangement, but only one section was built. Unlike other locomotives, it was not in regular service.

In 2006, Russian Railways introduced the GEM-10 switcher GTEL. The GEM-10 has a C-C wheel arrangement. The TGEM10-0001, which uses the same turbine and fuel as the GEM-10, is a two-unit (cow-calf) switcher GTEL with a  wheel arrangement. The slave unit of this locomotive is used as a fuel tender with compressed natural gas (CNG) and does not have a prime mover, so its traction motors are powered by the main section.

One section carries the LNG tank and the other houses the turbine with electric power generation, and both section have the traction motors and cabs. The locomotive has a  wheel arrangement, and up to three GT1 locomotives can be coupled together. On 23 January 2009, the GT1-001 conducted a test run with a 159-car train weighing ; further heavy-haul tests were carried out in December 2010. In a test run conducted in September 2011, the locomotive pulled 170 freight cars weighing . In 2012, the helper diesel engine that used for shunting operations was replaced with an accumulator, and the locomotive was renamed to GT1h (where 'h' stands for hybrid). The GT1h-001 remained a prototype and never went into production.

The successor to the GT1h-001 is the GT1h-002. Despite the same type designation, this locomotive has a fundamentally different design with a  wheel arrangement, derived from the TEM7 diesel shunting locomotive, and the new body with open LNG tank, derived from the body of the 2ES6 electric locomotive. Both GT1h locomotives are in operation in Egorshino in the Ural region.

Canada

Canadian National Railways (CN) was one of the operators of the Turbo, which were passed on to Via Rail. They operated on the major Toronto–Montreal route between 1968 and 1982, when they were replaced by the LRC.

In 2002, Bombardier Transportation announced the launch of the JetTrain, a high-speed trainset consisting of tilting carriages and a locomotive powered by a Pratt & Whitney turboshaft engine. Proposals were made to use the trains for Quebec City–Windsor, Orlando–Miami, and in Alberta, Texas, Nevada and the UK.
One prototype was built and tested, but no JetTrains have yet been sold for service. However, nothing ever came of any of these proposals, and the JetTrain essentially disappeared, being superseded by the Bombardier Zefiro line of conventionally powered high speed and very high speed trains. The JetTrain no longer appears on any of Bombardier's current web sites or promotional materials, although it can still be found on older web sites bearing the Canadair logos.

France

The first TGV prototype, TGV 001, was powered by a gas turbine, but steep oil prices prompted the change to overhead electric lines for power delivery.  However, two large classes of gas-turbine powered intercity railcars were constructed in the early 1970s (ETG and RTG) and were used extensively up to about 2000.

SNCF (French National Railways) used a number of gas-turbine trainsets, called the Turbotrain, in non-electrified territory. These typically consisted of a power car at each end with three cars between them. Turbotrain was in use up until 2005. After retirement, four sets were sold for further use in Iran.

Coal-firing

In the 1940s and 1950s research was conducted, in both the US and UK, aimed at building gas turbine locomotives that could run on pulverized coal.  The main problem was to avoid erosion of the turbine blades by particles of ash. Only one working example is known to have been produced and it was written off as a failure following testing.  The sources for the following information are Robertson and Sampson.

United States
In 1946, a Northrop-Hendy partnership launched an attempt to adapt the Northrop Turbodyne aircraft engine for locomotive use, with coal dust rather than kerosene as a fuel. In December 1946, Union Pacific donated their retired M-10002 streamliner locomotive to the project. However, the project was abandoned by the end of 1947 and there is no clear evidence that the locomotive provided for the experiment ever actually moved under gas turbine power or even had it installed. Details of the research were passed to Britain's London, Midland and Scottish Railway. Following a rise in fuel prices that was making their oil-fired GTELS uneconomic, UP experimentally revived the coal-fired gas turbine idea in the early 1960s, producing one prototype coal GTEL in October 1962. The problems with blade fouling and erosion were severe. The project was declared a failure after 20 months, during which time the locomotive ran less than 10,000 miles.

United Kingdom
On 23 December 1952, the UK Ministry of Fuel and Power placed an order for a coal-fired gas turbine locomotive to be used on British Railways.  The locomotive was to be built by the North British Locomotive Company and the turbine would be supplied by C. A. Parsons and Company.

According to Sampson, the plan was to use indirect heating.  The pulverized coal would be burned in a combustion chamber and the hot gases passed to a heat exchanger. Here, the heat would be transferred to a separate body of compressed air which would power the turbine. Essentially, it would have been a hot air engine using a turbine instead of a piston.

Robertson shows a diagram that confirms Sampson's information but also refers to problems with erosion of turbine blades by ash. This is strange because, with a conventional shell and tube heat exchanger, there would be no risk of ash entering the turbine circuit.

Working cycle

There were two separate, but linked, circuits: the combustion circuit and the turbine circuit.

 Combustion circuit.  Pulverized coal and air were mixed and burned in a combustion chamber and the hot gases passed to a heat exchanger where heat was transferred to the compressed air in the turbine circuit.  After leaving the heat exchanger the combustion gases entered a boiler to generate steam for train heating.
 Turbine circuit.  Air entered the compressor and was compressed.  The compressed air passed to the heat exchanger where it was heated by the combustion gases.  The heated compressed air drove two turbines; one to drive the compressor and the other to power the locomotive.  The turbine exhaust (which was hot air) then entered the combustion chamber to support the combustion.

Specification

The locomotive was never built but the specification was as follows:
 Wheel arrangement: C-C, later changed to 1A1A-A1A1
 Horsepower: 1,800, later reduced to 1,500
 Weight: 117 tons, later increased to 150 tons

The projected output was:
 Tractive effort,
  at 
  at 
 Thermal efficiency,
 10% at 1/10 load
 16% at half load
 19% at full load

The transmission was to be mechanical, via a two-speed gearbox, giving a high speed for passenger working and a lower speed for freight. The tractive effort figures, quoted above, look suspiciously high for the specified speeds. It seems more likely that the figures quoted are for starting tractive effort and maximum speed in high gear and low gear respectively. There is a model of the proposed locomotive at Glasgow Museum of Transport and some records are held at the National Railway Museum.

See also 
 Turbojet train
 Combined cycle powered railway locomotive

References

Sources

 UP: Gas Turbine Locomotives 
 Gas Turbine locomotive FAQ
 Gas turbines FAQ – NE Rails
 Union Pacific story 1934–1982 part 3
 Locomotive Engineers Journal; July, 1949
 GT1-001 – the 23 January 2009 test run

Further reading

External links 

 Photos of Union Pacific turbine locomotives, including coal fired turbine no. 80
 British Railways 18000
 Swiss gas turbine-electric locomotive
 Illustrated Encyclopedia of World Railway Locomotives – Am 4/6
 Shunting gas turbine locomotive 
 GT1-001 summary 
 Swiss homepage about free piston gas turbines 
 Gotaverken Motor AB 
 Diagram of a Renault/Pescara locomotive 

 
High-speed trains